The year 1717 in music involved some significant events.

Events
March 26 – Johann Sebastian Bach premieres his Weimarer Passion at the chapel of Friedrichstein Castle in Gotha
July 13 – Domenico Zipoli arrives in Buenos Aires with 52 other Jesuit missionaries.
July 17 – George Frideric Handel's Water Music is performed on the River Thames.
August – Handel becomes house composer at Cannons.
December 26 – Teatro Regio Ducale in Milan opens as an opera house.
Johann Sebastian Bach is appointed Kapellmeister by Leopold, Prince of Anhalt-Köthen.
Celebrated castrato Gaetano Berenstadt visits London and plays the lead in a revival of Handel's Rinaldo.

Classical music
Tomaso Albinoni – Violin Sonata in B-Flat Major, T. So 32
William Babell – Suits of the most Celebrated Lessons
Johann Sebastian Bach  
6 Kleine Präludien, BWV 933-938
5 Kleine Präludien, BWV 939-943
Violin Sonata in B minor, BWV 1014
Violin Sonata in E major, BWV 1016
Violin Sonata in C minor, BWV 1017
Violin Sonata in F minor, BWV 1018
Violin Sonata in G major, BWV 1019
Pietro G.G. Boni – Cello Sonata in C major, Op. 1
François Chauvon – Tibiades
François Couperin – Pièces de clavecin, book 2
Charles Dieupart – 6 Sonatas for a Flute and a Through Bass
Johann Friedrich Fasch – Brockes-Passion, FaWV F:1
Christoph Graupner – Wie wunderbar ist Gottes Güte, GWV 1103/17
Georg Friedrich Handel  
Dolc' è pur d'amor l'affanno, HWV 109a
Mi palpita il cor, HWV 132b
O be Joyful in the Lord, HWV 246
In the Lord I Put My Trust, HWV 247
Have Mercy upon Me, O God, HWV 248
O Sing unto the Lord a New Song, HWV 249b
I Will Magnify Thee, HWV 250a
O Praise the Lord with One Consent, HWV 254
The Lord is My Light, HWV 255
Oboe Concerto in B-flat major, HWV 302a
Concerto Grosso in G major, HWV 314
Water Music HWV 348-350
Trio Sonata in C minor, HWV 386a
Jacques Hotteterre – Suite in G major, Op. 6
Jean-Baptiste Loeillet – 12 Sonatas, Op. 5
Marin Marais – Pièces de viole, Livre 4
Pierre-Danican Philidor – 12 Suites, Opp. 1-3
Georg Philipp Telemann  
Gott der Hoffnung erfülle euch, TWV 1:634 (formerly BWV 218)
Herr, sei mir gnädig, denn mir ist Angst, TWV 1:769
Ich bin der Erste und der Letzte, TWV 1:816
Sehet an die Exempel der Alten, TWV 1:1259
Antonio Vandini – Cello Sonata in C major, IAV 5
Antonio Vivaldi 
Violin Sonata in C minor, RV 5
Concerto for Strings in C major, RV 114
Concerto for Strings in D major, RV 121
Concerto for Strings in D minor, RV 127
Concerto for 2 Oboes in C major, RV 534
Magnificat, RV 610
John Weaver (choreographer; composers unknown) – The Loves of Mars and Venus (ballet)

Opera
Antonio Maria Bononcini – La conquista del vello d'oro
Giuseppe Antonio Brescianello – Tisbe
Antonio Caldara – La verità nell'inganno
Leo Leonardo – Diana amante
Alessandro Scarlatti – Telemaco
Antonio Vivaldi 
L'Incoronazione di Dario
Tieteberga, RV 737

Births
January 4 – Antonio Maria Mazzoni, composer (died 1785)
April 9 – Georg Matthias Monn, composer (died 1750)
June 18 – Johann Stamitz, violinist and composer  (died 1757)
June 27 – Giacomo Durazzo, operatic impresario (died 1794)
date unknown
Leopold August Abel, violinist and composer (died 1794)
Elisabeth Lillström, Swedish operatic soprano (d. 1791)
William Williams Pantycelyn, Welsh hymn writer (died 1791)
probable – Marimutthu Pillai, composer of Carnatic music (died c.1787)

Deaths
February 11 – Johann Jakob Walther, violinist and composer (born 1650)
April 3 – Christian Friedrich Witt, composer, music editor and teacher (born c.1660)
October 13 – Wolfgang Printz, composer and cantor (born 1641)
November 26 – Daniel Purcell, composer (born 1664)
date unknown 
Pierre Bouteiller, composer (born 1655)
Goffredo Cappa, luthier (born 1644)
Friedrich Erhard Niedt, jurist, music theorist, and composer (born 1674)
probable – Francisco Guerau, composer (born 1649)

References

 
18th century in music
Music by year